The Mendip Power Group is a group of owners installing micro-hydroelectric turbines in a number of historic former watermills in the Mendip area of Somerset, England. The Group is one of several formed after the concept was developed by the South Somerset Hydropower Group.

The first to start electricity generation was Tellisford Mill, on the River Frome, which began operating in April 2007 and which is ultimately expected to produce 75 kW.

Other mills in the Group, together with initial assessments of their capacity, include: Stowford Mill (37 kW) and Shawford Mill (31 kW), Jackdaws Iron Works (10 kW), Glencot House (5.8 kW), Burcott Mill (5.2 kW), Bleadney Mill (5.4 kW), Coleford Mill (6.6 kW), Old Mill (5.2 kW) and Farrants Mill (9.9 kW).

It has been calculated that harnessing the power from all the streams and rivers in the UK could generate 10,000 GWh per year, enough to supply 3% of national generating capacity.

See also

:Category:Community electricity generation in the United Kingdom
Energy use and conservation in the United Kingdom
Energy policy of the United Kingdom
Energy conservation
Renewable energy

External links
Tellisford Mill’s 50kW hydro plant lights up the community

References

Community electricity generation in the United Kingdom
Electric power companies of the United Kingdom
Hydroelectricity in the United Kingdom
Mendip District